Nantcwnlle is a community in Ceredigion, Wales, including the villages of Talsarn, Ceredigion, and Llwyn-y-groes.

Daniel Rowland (1713–1790), was born in Nantcwnlle; he was one of the leading evangelists in Wales.

References

Villages in Ceredigion